McNairy is an unincorporated community in McNairy County, in the U.S. state of Tennessee.

History
McNairy had its start when the railroad was extended to that point. A variant name was "McNairy Station". A post office called McNairy Station was established in 1866, the name was change to McNairy in 1882, and the post office closed in 1979.

References

Unincorporated communities in McNairy County, Tennessee